Nadira Ait Oumghar (born August 2, 1994 in Béjaïa) is an Algerian volleyball player.

Information
Nihad Hihat's hometown is Seddouk, Bejaia. She is about 5 feet and 9 inches tall. She weighs about 160 pounds. She can block at the height of about 9 feet.
Hihat knows the following languages:
 Arabic
 French
 Amazigh

Club information
Current club :  RC Bejaia

References

External links
 
 

1995 births
Volleyball players from Béjaïa
Living people
Algerian women's volleyball players
Liberos
21st-century Algerian people